Guni Israeli (born 18 November 1984) is an Israeli professional basketball player who last played for Hapoel Galil Elyon of the Israeli National League. In 2007, he was the Israeli Premier League Assists Leader.

Early years 
Israeli was born in Kibbutz Gvat, Israel. He played for Hapoel Emek Yizra'el (Jezreel Valley) youth team, he also played for Ort Leibovich, Netanya high-school team, together with Raviv Limonad and helped them to win the state championship.

Professional career 
In 2005, Israeli signed with Hapoel Gilboa/Afula. In his second season with Afula, he was named Israeli League Rising Star.

In 2007, he was the Israeli Premier League Assists Leader.

On 18 June 2007, Israeli signed with Hapoel Holon for the 2007–08 season. Israeli helped Holon to win the 2008 Israeli League Championship.

On 2 July 2008, Israeli signed with Hapoel Gilboa Galil. In his second season with the team, Israeli helped Gilboa Galil to win 2010 Israeli League Championship. On 22 June 2010, Israeli signed a one-year contract extension with Gilboa Galil.

On 29 July 2011, Israeli signed with a two-year contract with Hapoel Jerusalem.

On 18 July 2013, Israeli returned to Hapoel Holon for a second stint, signing a two-year deal. On 24 June 2015, Israeli signed a two-year contract extension with Holon.

On 6 June 2017, Israeli returned to Maccabi Ashdod for a second stint, signing a one-year deal. On 8 November 2017, Israeli parted ways with Ashdod after appearing in five games. Two days later, Israeli signed with Maccabi Haifa for the remainder of the season. On 28 March 2018, Israeli parted ways with Haifa.

On 26 June 2018, Israeli signed a two-year deal with Hapoel Galil Elyon of the Liga Leumit.

References

External links 
 RealGM.com profile
 Basket.co.il profile

1984 births
Living people
Hapoel Galil Elyon players
Hapoel Gilboa Galil Elyon players
Hapoel Gilboa/Afula players
Hapoel Holon players
Hapoel Jerusalem B.C. players
Israeli men's basketball players
Maccabi Ashdod B.C. players
Maccabi Givat Shmuel players
Maccabi Haifa B.C. players
Point guards
People from Northern District (Israel)